Genene Anne Jones (born July 13, 1950) is an American serial killer, responsible for the deaths of up to 60 infants and children in her care as a licensed vocational nurse during the 1970s and 1980s. In 1984, Jones was convicted of murder and injury to a child. She had used injections of digoxin, heparin, and later succinylcholine to induce medical crises in her patients, causing numerous deaths. The exact number of victims remains unknown; hospital officials allegedly misplaced and then destroyed records of Jones' activities, to prevent further litigation after Jones' first conviction.

Early life and marriages
Jones was adopted by a nightclub owner and his wife. She worked as a beautician before attending nursing school in the late 1970s.

Jones was married to her high school sweetheart between 1968 and 1974, and they had one child during that time. The relationship ended in divorce. Three years later Jones and her husband reconciled and had another child together in 1977. Just before her indictment, she married a 19-year-old nursing assistant. He filed for divorce a short time later.

Career and background
While Jones worked as a licensed vocational nurse (LVN) at the Bexar County Hospital (now University Hospital of San Antonio) in the pediatric intensive care unit, a statistically improbable number of children died under her care. Because the hospital feared being sued, it simply asked all of its LVNs, including Jones, to resign and staffed the pediatric ICU exclusively with registered nurses. No further investigation was pursued by the hospital.

Jones left and took a position at a pediatrician's clinic in Kerrville, Texas, some 60 miles northwest of San Antonio. It was here that she was charged with poisoning six children. The doctor in the office discovered two puncture marks in a bottle of succinylcholine (Suxamethonium chloride) in the drug storage, where only she and Jones had access. Contents of the apparently full bottle were later found to be heavily diluted with water, where it was estimated that only 20% of the vial's contents were succinylcholine. Succinylcholine is a powerful short-acting paralytic that causes temporary paralysis of all skeletal muscles, as well as those that control breathing; the drug is used as a part of general anesthetic.  A patient cannot breathe while under the influence of this drug. In small children, cardiac arrest is the ultimate result of deoxygenation due to lack of respiration.

Jones claimed she was trying to stimulate the creation of a pediatric intensive care unit in Kerrville.

Prosecution
In 1985, Jones was sentenced to 99 years in prison for killing 15-month-old Chelsea McClellan with succinylcholine. Later that year, she was sentenced to a concurrent term of 60 years in prison for nearly killing Rolando Santos with heparin.

As of May 2016, Jones was held at the Lane Murray Unit of the Texas Department of Criminal Justice. She had been scheduled for mandatory release in 2018 due to a Texas law meant to prevent prison overcrowding. To avoid this, Jones was indicted on May 25, 2017, for the murder of 11-month-old Joshua Sawyer. Nico LaHood, Bexar County District Attorney, stated that additional charges could be filed in the deaths of other children. Due to the mandatory early-release law covering Jones' original convictions, she would otherwise have been released upon completion of a third of the original sentence. The new charges were filed to prevent her release. In April 2018, a judge in San Antonio denied a request to dismiss five new murder indictments against Jones. On January 16, 2020, Jones pleaded guilty to the murder of 11-month-old Joshua Sawyer on December 12, 1981 as part of a plea bargain in which four other charges were dropped. She was sentenced to life in prison. She will not be eligible for parole until she is roughly 87 years old.

In popular culture
She was portrayed by Susan Ruttan in the television movie Deadly Medicine (1991) and by Alicia Bartya in the straight-to-video movie Mass Murder (2002). She was also featured in a Discovery Channel documentary, Lethal Injection; the Forensic Files episode "Nursery Crimes"; a season one episode of the British docuseries Nurses Who Kill (2016); as well as "Dark Secrets," an episode of the Investigation Discovery series Deadly Women.

See also
 Beverley Allitt
 Miyuki Ishikawa

General:
 List of serial killers in the United States

References

External links
 Mass Murder
 Genene Jones Letter to the Texas Board of Nursing (March 2011)

1950 births
21st-century American women
American female criminals
American female murderers
American female serial killers
American murderers of children
American nurses
American people convicted of murder
American women nurses
Criminals from Texas
Living people
Medical serial killers
Nurses convicted of killing patients
People convicted of murder by Texas
People from San Antonio
Poisoners